Mamu is a rural locality in the Cassowary Coast Region, Queensland, Australia. Mamu’s postcode is 4871.

Geography 
The locality lies completely within three protected areas. The western part of the locality is within the Wooroonooran National Park which extends into neighbouring localities of Wooroonooran, Palmerston and Gulngai. The eastern part of the locality is within the Japoon National Park and Japoon State Forest. The Japoon National Park extends into neighbouring Mena Creek and Gulngai.

 Mount Utchee at 
There are two waterfalls. Binda Falls is on the South Johnstone River. Cowley Falls on Mitcha Creek  and are named after Ebenezer Cowley, the horticulturalist and overseer of the Kamerunga State Nursery. Cowley Falls can be reached by a  track from the Palmerston Highway.

Beehive Island is a  island in the South Johnstone River which extends into neighbouring Coorumba.

History 

Attractions 

There are two lookouts:

 Crawfords Lookout, named after Vic Crawford

 McNamee Lookout
Despite the name, the Mamu Rainforest Tropical Skywalk is actually just outside of the locality in neighbouring Wooroonooran. It is on the Palmerston Highway not far from Crawfords Lookout.

References 

Cassowary Coast Region
Localities in Queensland